Mexcala smaragdina is a jumping spider that lives in Nigeria.

References

Endemic fauna of Nigeria
Salticidae
Spiders described in 2012
Spiders of Africa
Fauna of Nigeria